Derek John Hodgkinson (born 30 April 1944) is an English footballer, who played as an inside forward in the Football League for Manchester City and Stockport County.

References

Manchester City F.C. players
Living people
Margate F.C. players
Stockport County F.C. players
Bangor City F.C. players
English Football League players
Association football inside forwards
1944 births
English footballers
People from Banwell